Nils-Udo (born 1937) is a German artist from Bavaria who has been creating environmental art since the 1960s when he moved away from painting and the studio and began to work with, and in, nature. He began in the 1960s as a painter on traditional surfaces, in Paris, but moved to his home country in Bavaria and started to  plant creations, putting them in Nature's hands to develop, and eventually disappear. As his work became more ephemeral, Udo introduced photography as part of his art to document and share it. Perhaps the best known example of his work for the general public is the cover design for Peter Gabriel's OVO. Nils-Udo seeks to offer a mutualist vision wherein nature as environment is an omnipresent backdrop. In revealing the diversity in a specific environment, he establishes links between human and natural history, between nature and humanity that are always there, yet seldom recognized. Nils-Udo uses natural materials, such as sticks, petals, branches, to create site-specific installations.

Selected works and projects

OVO (2000) 
Peter Gabriel contacted Nils Udo to create an installation for the cover for his new album OVO. Udo created a nest-like structure supported by tree trunks, which made it very heavy. Inside the nest lay the child of a Real World (Studio in England where the album was recorded) employee (The child, Josh, is the son of Susie Millns at Real World’s Art department). The photograph was taken and then the installation was moved into Peter Gabriels's garden nearby. Finally due to issues of what to do with it, the gardener set the structure on fire. This did not upset Udo as his work is transient and there is a photograph that keeps the artwork still living. Its called OVO because it has an OVO form.

Stone-Age-Man (2001) 
Stone-Age-Man is a monumental sculpture in Wittgensteiner-Sauerland, Germany. Udo creates the effect of an ancient temple by installing in the middle of the structure an enormous cube of rock framed by a monumental architectural trunk form made out of wood. The quartzite monolith weighs almost 150 tons and, integrated into the peaceful grandeur of the forest, it forms a monument and memorial in its own right: its size, its timeless association with the earth, and its uniqueness. When exposed to this powerful entity, the viewer experiences his/her own temporality and vulnerability.

Radeau d'Automne (2013–2014) 
The community of d’Éguzon-Chantôme and Crozant had the desire of local authorities to initiate artistic and cultural projects in a remote rural areas based on the environmental qualities of its sites. Udo proposed Radeau d' Automne as a monumental sculpture designed with natural materials. In the shape of a stylized maple half-leaf, 6.80 meters long and 3.90 meters high, the work is built in round trunks with light chestnut wood, assembled "with the old "tenons, mortises and ankles. This traditional, solid and aesthetic blend, as well as the use of a local essence and strong identity, reinforces the link to the territory. It was here to give shape to a space, the space of the valley of the Creuse, marked by the history of pictorial currents of the nineteenth century. and 20th century. and thus exposing himself to a new reading, to a new look: the wooden raft and water, leaf reflecting on the river at the foot of the granite ruins and recalling the steep ridges of the surrounding landscape. When asked about this work Udo responded “Even if I work parallel to nature and only intervene with the greatest possible care, a basic internal contradiction remains. It is a contradiction that underlies all of my work, which itself can’t escape the inherent fatality of our existence. It harms what it touches : the virginity of nature… To realize what is possible and latent in Nature, to literally realize what has never existed, utopia becomes reality. A second life suffices. The event has taken place. I have only animated it and made it visible.”

Other Important Works 
 Tower: Benthelm sandstone, Nordhorn, Germany, 1982
 Waterhouse: spruce trunks, birch branches, willow switches and sod on tidal flats,Waddensee mudflats, Holland, 1982
 Chestnut leaf, vetch flowers, pond, Vassiviere, Limousin, France, 1986
 Bindweed flowers held in their journey on a stream by a stick dam. Reunion, Indian Ocean,  1990.
 Robinia Leaf Swing: Robinia leaf halved, ash twigs, Valle de Sella, Italy, 1992.
 The Blue Flower: Landscape for heinrich von Ofterdingen, planting of 10,000 wildflowers in Munich, Germany,  1993–96.
 Tadpole Willow: Fern leaves and mud, view of site specific work in Marchiennes, France,  1994.
 Root-Sculpture, Mexico City, 1995
 Dune Edge: pampas grass, sand, wind—Namibia, 2001
 Lost in the immensity of the mountainous red sand dunes of Namibia. One of the oldest deserts in the world. Not a breath of wind, not a sound. The tracks of a solitary gazelle crisscross the huge immaculate hollow at the foot of one gigantic dune. The shadow of late afternoon sun rapidly draws closer. - Nils Udo
 The Nest: National Garden Show, Munich, Germany, 2005 
 Sella Nest: Spruce logs and white marble, Valle di Sella, Italy, 2008
 Entrance: Mountain Bluets, Pigment print 135x180 cm , Pyrenees , 2018

From His Own Words 
 "Moving from Paris to rural Bavaria, perceiving the endangerment of nature, its growing destruction, I lived through a profound change of awareness."
 "Being a part of nature, being embedded in it and living on it, it appeared to me that acting in compliance with the laws of nature was something self-evident and necessary for survival."
 "[My art is a] documentation of a dying world experience. To bear witness, at the last possible moment, to a now seemingly anachronistic perception of life, an attitude that can barely be understood, even by those willing to do so."
 "Nature is still complete and inexhaustible in her most remote refuges, her magic still real. At any time, meaning any season, in all weathers, in things great and small. Always. Potential Utopias are under every stone, on every leaf and behind every tree, in the clouds and in the wind. Pitting poetry against the inhuman river of time"
 "We must realize our responsibility for what is happening, for society. Art always deals with reality. Those who shut their eyes to reality are liars and deprive themselves of any meaningful possibility of acting in society and (in the history of) art. What we are working for, if not for man, for society? Despite clear-sighted pessimism – we must hope in order to live. What counts for me is that my actions, Utopia-like, fuse life and art into each other."
 "Everything perceivable through human senses takes part--Natural space experienced through hearing, seeing, smelling, tasting and touching. By means of the smallest possible interventions, living, three-dimensional natural space is reorganized, unlocked and put under tension."
 “By installing plantings or by integrating them into more complex installations, the work is literally implanted into nature. As a part of nature, the work lives and passes away in the rhythm of the seasons.”

Bibliography 
 Nils-Udo: Art In Nature, 2002, 
 Le maïs, 1996, 
 Nids, 2003, 
 Nils-Udo: sur l'eau, 2015,

Gallery

See also 
 Andy Goldsworthy
 Environmental art
 Environmental sculpture
 Greenmuseum.org
 Land art

References

External links 

 Nils-Udo
 Nils-Udo on artnet
 black flamingo agency represents Nils-Udo for commissioned work

1937 births
Living people
People from Nürnberger Land
Photographers from Bavaria
German sculptors
German male sculptors
German installation artists
Land artists